The 1987 Australian Drivers' Championship was a CAMS sanctioned national motor racing title contested over a single race for Australian Formula 2 racing cars. The race, billed as the "Australia Cup for the 1987 CAMS Gold Star", was staged at the Adelaide Street Circuit in South Australia on Friday, 13 November 1987. This was the first year that the championship had been restricted to Australian Formula 2 cars and is the only year to date in which the title has been awarded on the results of a single race rather than a series of races.

David Brabham won the race after a remarkable drive from grid position 38 after poor qualifying caused by missing almost all of practice with carburettor and electrical problems.

While Brabham picked his way through the field the battle for the race saw Rohan Onslow and Mark McLaughlin take the lead after polesitter Arthur Abrahams was left on the grid with a failed ignition ballast restrictor. McLaughlin led for much of the race but his Elfin slowed near the end of the race and was swamped by Onslow then Brabham. With two laps remaining Brabham caught and passed Onlow and pulled away for a 1.7-second victory.

Ian Richards and John Wise fought over fourth for much of the event but Wise slowed near the end of the race with Shane Flynn taking fifth ahead of Chris Hocking.

Classification 
Results as follows.

 Note: Given that there were thirty six cars on the grid, there are eight drivers not accounted for in the above table.

References

Australian Drivers' Championship
Drivers' Championship
Australian Formula 2